The following lists events that happened during 1946 in Southern Rhodesia.

Incumbents
 Prime Minister: Godfrey Huggins

Events

Births
 February 2 - David Gopito, sculptor
 August 1 - Nicholas Goche, politician
 September 15 - Emmerson Mnangagwa, politician
 November 4 - Quintin Goosen, cricketer and umpire

Deaths

 
Years of the 20th century in Southern Rhodesia
Zimbabwe
Zimbabwe, 1946 In